The 2015–16 season was the 113th in the history of the Southern League, which is an English football competition featuring semi-professional and amateur clubs from the South West, South Central and Midlands of England and South Wales. From the 2014–15 season onwards, the Southern League is known as Evo-Stik League Southern, following a sponsorship deal with Evo-Stik.

The league constitution was announced on 15 May 2015.

After the constitution was announced, Clevedon Town of Division One South & West were demoted because their floodlights were not to the required standard. As a result, Ware were transferred to Division One Central from Isthmian League Division One North, Fleet Town and Petersfield Town were transferred from Division One South & West to Division One Central, and Burnham, Marlow and newly promoted Flackwell Heath were transferred in the opposite direction.

Flackwell Heath subsequently decided to refuse their promotion and stay in the Hellenic League. Redhill, who had been relegated from Isthmian League Division One South, were offered Flackwell Heath's place, but they refused due to travelling and financial reasons. Their position was then offered to Wessex League runners-up Winchester City, who accepted.

Premier Division
The Premier Division consisted of 24 clubs, including 18 clubs from the previous season and six new clubs:
Two clubs promoted from Division One Central: 
Bedworth United
Kettering Town

Two clubs promoted from Division One South & West: 
Merthyr Town
Stratford Town

Plus:
King's Lynn Town, transferred from the Northern Premier League
Leamington, relegated from Conference North

League table

Top scorers

Play-offs

Semi-finals

Final

Results

Stadia and locations

Division One Central
Division One Central consisted of 22 clubs, including 16 clubs from previous season and six new clubs:
AFC Rushden & Diamonds, promoted from the United Counties League
Arlesey Town, relegated from the Premier Division
Fleet Town, transferred from Division One South & West
Kings Langley, promoted from the Spartan South Midlands League
Petersfield Town, promoted from the Wessex League
Ware, transferred from Isthmian League Division One North

League table

Top scorers

Play-offs

Semi-finals

Final

Results

Stadia and locations

Division One South & West
Division One South & West consisted of 22 clubs, including 17 clubs from previous season and five new clubs:
Banbury United, relegated from the Premier Division
Burnham, relegated from the Premier Division
Marlow, transferred from Division One Central
Slimbridge, promoted from the Western League
Winchester City, promoted from the Wessex League

Flackwell Heath were initially promoted from the Hellenic League, but refused promotion after being switched from Division One Central to Division One South & West. Their place eventually went to Winchester City.

League table

Top scorers

Play-offs

Semi-finals

Final

Results

Stadia and locations

League Cup

The Southern League Cup 2015–16 (billed as the RedInsure Cup 2015–16 for sponsorship reasons) is the 78th season of the Southern League Cup , the cup competition of the Southern Football League.

Preliminary round

1st round

2nd round

3rd round

Quarter-finals

Semi-finals

Final

First leg

Second leg

See also
Southern Football League
2015–16 Isthmian League
2015–16 Northern Premier League

References

External links
Official website

Southern Football League seasons
7